Harry Millington may refer to:
 Harry Millington (rugby league)
 Harry Millington (politician)